Zuyevsky District is an administrative and municipal district (raion), one of the thirty-nine in Kirov Oblast, Russia. It is located in the east of the oblast. Its administrative center is the town of Zuyevka. Population:  27,823 (2002 Census);  The population of Zuyevka accounts for 49.6% of the district's total population.

References

Notes

Sources

Districts of Kirov Oblast